Barney's Beanery is a chain of gastropubs in the Greater Los Angeles Area. John "Barney" Anthony founded it in 1920 in Berkeley, California, and in 1927 he moved it to U.S. Route 66, now Santa Monica Boulevard, (State Route 2) in West Hollywood. As of 2011, Barney's Beanery had locations in Burbank, Pasadena (taking the ground floor of Q's Billiards at 99 East Colorado Boulevard), Santa Monica, Westwood, Redondo Beach at the Redondo Beach Pier and the original in West Hollywood.

Association with celebrities
Barney's location, combined with the fact that the owner extended credit and occasionally gave away food, made the bar popular with people with diverse backgrounds, including artists, writers, and other celebrities. Older Hollywood actors such as Clara Bow, Clark Gable, Errol Flynn, Judy Garland and Rita Hayworth were all regulars in their day. By the 1960s, the neighboring Sunset Strip had become an important music center, and Jim Morrison (who was reportedly thrown out of Barney's for urinating on the bar) and Janis Joplin became regulars (Barney's was the final place Joplin visited before her death in October 1970). Poet Charles Bukowski hung around, as did artists Ed Kienholz and others associated with the Ferus Gallery, which was located nearby on La Cienega Boulevard. Quentin Tarantino also allegedly wrote most of the screenplay for his film Pulp Fiction sitting in his favorite booth at the original Barney's Beanery in West Hollywood. Jon Taffer got his start in the nightclub and bar industry here as a bartender while performing as a drummer in a live band.

History of discrimination towards homosexuals

In the 1930s, 1940s, or around 1953 John Anthony put up a sign among the old license plates and other ephemera along the wall behind the bar that read "FAGOTS – STAY OUT". Though Anthony was known to be antagonistic towards gays, going as far as posing (in front of his sign) for a picture in a 1964 Life article on "Homosexuality in America" over a caption where he exclaims "I don't like 'em...", the sign was ostensibly put up as a response to pressure from the police who had a tendency towards discriminatory practices against homosexuals and consequently establishments that catered to the group.

After Anthony died in 1968, efforts to remove the sign continued. A coalition of gay activist groups organized a zap of the restaurant on February 7, 1970, to push for its removal; the sign came down that day. The sign was put up and taken down several times over the next 14 years, and the restaurant's matchbooks also bore the line, but that practice ended in December 1984, days after the city of West Hollywood voted itself into existence. Then-mayor Valerie Terrigno, the entire city council and gay rights activists marched into Barney’s and relieved the wall of the offending sign. It was held by Morris Kight for many years and now rests in the ONE National Gay & Lesbian Archives.

In the news
Barney's received attention in early 2011 when one of their busboys, Ricardo Reyes, defeated LeBron James, Kobe Bryant, Carmelo Anthony, Charles Barkley, Lamar Odom, Glen Davis and Blake Griffin in Pop-A-Shot, a mini basketball shooting competition, on Jimmy Kimmel Live!

In pop culture
Parts of Oliver Stone's film The Doors were filmed at Barney's Beanery.

In the TV film series Columbo, Columbo often ordered chili at Barney's Beanery. However, the series was not filmed in the actual location.  

In 1965 Edward Kienholz created “The Beanery,” a life-size sculpture tableaux of the interior, inhabited by poorly dressed store mannequins whose “faces” are clocks set at 10:10.  An audiotape of barroom chatter, and the odor of beer, accompanied the display. A newspaper in a vending machine is headlined "Children Kill Children in Vietnam.” The work was first unveiled in the restaurant parking lot, and is now in the Stedelijk Museum Amsterdam. 

On the cover of the Big Brother and the Holding Company album Cheap Thrills, vibes on the song "Turtle Blues" are credited to Barney's Beanery.  Also, there is an illustration of the diner by R. Crumb, who did the artwork for the album. 

Country rock band New Riders of the Purple Sage talk of hanging out at Barney's Beanery in their song Lonesome L.A. Cowboy.

In the 2015 You're the Worst episode "There Is Not Currently a Problem," Lindsay Jillian says, "I once sucked Malcolm-Jamal Warner's dick at Barney's Beanery."

Barney's Beanery appears in the opening credits of the film Grease

References

References
 Clendinen, Dudley and Nagourney, Adam (1999). Out for Good: The Struggle to Build a Gay Rights Movement in America. New York: Simon & Schuster. 
 Collins, Judy (2011). Sweet Judy Blue Eyes: My Life in Music. New York: Random House. 
 Kenney, Moira (2001). Mapping Gay L.A.: The Intersection of Place and Politics. Temple University Press. .
 Lawson, Kristan and Rufus, Anneli. (2000). California Babylon. New York: St. Martin's. 
 Pincus, Robert L. (1994). On a Scale that Competes with the World: The Art of Edward and Nancy Reddin Kienholz. California: UC Press.
 Teal, Donn (1971, reissued 1995). The Gay Militants: How Gay Liberation Began in America, 1969–1971. New York, St. Martin's Press.  (1995 edition).
 White, C. Todd (2009). Pre-Gay LA: A Social History of the Movement for Homosexual Rights. Chicago: University of Illinois Press.

External links

1920 establishments in California
Landmarks in Los Angeles
LGBT history in California
Restaurants established in 1920
Restaurants in Los Angeles
Restaurants in West Hollywood, California